Mahmoud Al-Kheirat (born 16 September 1970) is a Syrian retired middle-distance runner and athlete. Al-Kheirat won a bronze medal in 800 m at the 1998 Asian Athletics Championships held in Fukuoka. He is also a multiple medalist from the Pan Arab Games and Arab Championships. He represented Syria three times during his career at the World Athletics Indoor Championships. He is the current Syrian record holder of the outdoor 800 m, 1500 m and indoor 800 metres events.

Personal bests
Outdoor
800 m – 1:47.45 NR (Esch-sur-Alzette 1998)
1500 m – 3:48.12 NR (Beirut 1999)
Indoor
800 m – 1:50.02 NiR (New York 2002)

Competition record

Major victories
Outdoor
 2002 Sacramento PA Championships 800 m - 1:51.02
 2002 Long Beach Socal USATF Ch. 800 m - 1:50.13
Indoor
 2001 Lincoln Wolf Pack Inv. 800 m - 1:50.83
 2001 Los Angeles Invitational 800 m - 1:52.39 (3rd)
 2002 Los Angeles Invitational 800 m - 1:54.23 (4th)
 2003 New York Armory Open 800 m - 1:51.77 (4th)

References

External links
 

1970 births
Living people
Syrian male athletes
20th-century Syrian people
21st-century Syrian people
Syrian male middle-distance runners
Athletes (track and field) at the 1998 Asian Games